The 2015 ANA Inspiration was the 44th ANA Inspiration, held April 2–5 on the Dinah Shore Tournament Course at Mission Hills Country Club in Rancho Mirage, California. The tournament was in its first year with All Nippon Airways (ANA) as the title sponsor and its 33rd year as a major championship. 2009 champion Brittany Lincicome eagled the 72nd hole to force a playoff, then defeated Stacy Lewis on the third extra hole to win her second major title. Golf Channel televised the event.

Field
Players who qualified for the event are listed below. Players are listed under the first category in which they qualified; additional qualifying categories are shown in parentheses.

1. Active LPGA Tour Hall of Fame members (must have participated in ten official LPGA Tour tournaments within the 12 months prior to the commitment deadline)

Juli Inkster (2), Se Ri Pak (6), Karrie Webb (2,5,6,7,8,9)

2. Winners of all previous ANA Inspirations

Amy Alcott, Pat Hurst, Stacy Lewis (3,5,6,7,8,9), Brittany Lincicome (7,8,9), Inbee Park (3,5,7,8,9), Morgan Pressel (6,8), Lexi Thompson (5,6,8,9), Yani Tseng (3,8), Sun-Young Yoo (8)

3. Winners of the U.S. Women's Open, Women's PGA Championship, and Ricoh Women's British Open in the previous five years

Na Yeon Choi (5,6,7,8,9), Paula Creamer (5,8,9), Shanshan Feng (5,6,7,8,9), Cristie Kerr (5,6,8,9), Mo Martin (5,7,8), So Yeon Ryu (5,7,8,9), Michelle Wie (5,6,7,8,9)

Jiyai Shin (5,6) did not play

4. Winners of The Evian Championship in the previous two years

Kim Hyo-joo (5,7,9,10), Suzann Pettersen (5,7,8,9)

5. Winners of official LPGA Tour tournaments from the 2012 Kraft Nabisco Championship through the week immediately preceding the 2015 ANA Inspiration

Baek Kyu-jung (9), Austin Ernst (8), M. J. Hur (7,8), Jennifer Johnson (8), Christina Kim (6,8), Kim Sei-young (9), Lydia Ko (7,8,9,12), Jessica Korda (7,8,9), Brittany Lang (8), Ilhee Lee (8), Mi Hyang Lee (8), Mirim Lee (8,9), Teresa Lu (9,10), Ai Miyazato, Mika Miyazato, Anna Nordqvist (6,7,8,9), Lee-Anne Pace (8,9), Park Hee-young (8), Beatriz Recari (8), Lizette Salas (8,9), Amy Yang (6,7,8,9)

Azahara Muñoz (6,7,8,9) did not play

6. All players who finished in the top-20 in the previous year's ANA Inspiration

Chella Choi (8,9), Charley Hull (10), Tiffany Joh (8), Lee Jee-young, Caroline Masson (8), Catriona Matthew (8), Gerina Piller (8), Angela Stanford (7,8,9)

7. All players who finished in the top-5 of the previous year's U.S. Women's Open, Wegmans LPGA Championship, Ricoh Women's British Open and The Evian Championship

Julieta Granada (8), Jang Ha-na (9), Ji Eun-hee (8), Meena Lee (8), Stephanie Meadow

8. Top-80 on the previous year's season-ending LPGA Tour official money list

Marina Alex, Amy Anderson, Dori Carter, Carlota Ciganda, Laura Davies, Laura Diaz, Jodi Ewart Shadoff, Sandra Gal, Mina Harigae, Caroline Hedwall, Karine Icher, Moriya Jutanugarn, Danielle Kang, Haeji Kang, Kim Kaufman, I.K. Kim, Katherine Kirk, P.K. Kongkraphan, Candie Kung, Amelia Lewis, Pernilla Lindberg, Sydnee Michaels, Belén Mozo, Haru Nomura, Oh Ji-young, Jane Park, Pornanong Phatlum (9), Paula Reto, Dewi Claire Schreefel, Giulia Sergas, Jenny Shin, Sarah Jane Smith, Thidapa Suwannapura, Kris Tamulis, Ayako Uehara, Mariajo Uribe

Line Vedel did not play

9. Top-30 on the Women's World Golf Rankings as of a March 10, 2015

Chun In-gee

Ahn Sun-ju (10) did not play

10. Top-2 players from the previous year's season-ending Ladies European Tour Order of Merit, LPGA of Japan Tour money list and LPGA of Korea Tour money list

Heo Yoon-kyung, Gwladys Nocera

11. Top-20 players plus ties on the current year LPGA Tour official money list at the end of the last official tournament prior to the current ANA Inspiration, not otherwise qualified above, provided such players are within the top-80 positions on the current year LPGA Tour official money list at the beginning of the tournament competition

Katie Burnett, Paz Echeverria, Yueer Cindy Feng, Jaye Marie Green, María Hernández, Wei-Ling Hsu, Ariya Jutanugarn, Alison Lee, Minjee Lee, Xi Yu Lin, Alena Sharp, Kelly Shon, Jennifer Song, Alison Walshe, Sakura Yokomine

12. Previous year's Louise Suggs Rolex Rookie of the Year

13. Previous year's U.S. Women's Amateur champion, provided she is still an amateur at the beginning of tournament competition

Kristen Gillman did not play

14. Any LPGA Member who did not compete in the previous year's ANA Inspiration major due to injury, illness or maternity, who subsequently received a medical/maternity extension of membership from the LPGA in the previous calendar year, provided they were otherwise qualified to compete in the previous year's ANA Inspiration

15. Up to six sponsor invitations for top-ranked amateur players

Céline Boutier (a), Nelly Korda (a), Andrea Lee (a), Mika Liu (a), Haley Moore (a),  Bethany Wu (a)

Nationalities in the field

Past champions in the field

Made the cut

Missed the cut

Course layout

Dinah Shore Tournament Course

Round summaries

First round
Thursday, April 2, 2015

Morgan Pressel, the event's 2007 champion, shot a 5-under-par 67 to take a one-stroke lead over Ai Miyazato. Lydia Ko shot a one-under par 71 to tie Annika Sörenstam with 29 consecutive rounds under par in LPGA Tour events. Defending champion Lexi Thompson shot an ever par 72.

Second round
Friday, April 3, 2015

LPGA Tour rookie Kim Sei-young took the lead, shooting the day's low score of 65. Lydia Ko shot a round of one-over-par 73 to end her record-tying streak of 29 consecutive rounds. 73 players made the cut, which fell at three-over-par.

Third round
Saturday, April 4, 2015

Final round
Sunday, April 5, 2015

Source:
Amateurs: Haley Moore (+6)

Scorecard
Final round

Playoff
The playoff was held on the par-5 18th hole only and Lincicome won on the third extra hole with a par.

References

External links

Coverage on the LPGA Tour official site

Chevron Championship
Golf in California
Sports in Riverside County, California
Rancho Mirage, California
ANA Inspiration
ANA Inspiration
ANA Inspiration
ANA Inspiration